Gyula Bartos (born Salamon Prinz; 7 April 1872 – 21 May 1954) was a Hungarian stage and film actor. He performed for many years at the National Theatre in Budapest.

Bartos was born in Szeged and died in Budapest.

Selected filmography
 St. Peter's Umbrella (1917)
 The Stork Caliph (1917)
 Faun (1918)
 White Rose (1919)
 Number 111 (1919)
 Man of Gold (1919)
 Fekete hajnal (1943)
 Déryné (1951)

Bibliography
 Kulik, Karol. Alexander Korda: The Man Who Could Work Miracles. Virgin Books, 1990.

References

External links

1872 births
1954 deaths
Hungarian male film actors
Hungarian male silent film actors
20th-century Hungarian male actors
Hungarian male stage actors
People from Szeged